Lawrence Allen Zalcman (June 9, 1943 – May 31, 2022) was professor emeritus of Mathematics at Bar-Ilan University. His research concerns Complex analysis and potential theory, and their relations with approximation theory, harmonic analysis, integral geometry and partial differential equations. On top of his scientific achievements, Zalcman received numerous awards for mathematical exposition, including the Chauvenet Prize in 1976, the Lester R. Ford Award in 1975 and 1981, and the Paul R. Halmos – Lester R. Ford Award in 2017.

Zalcman was born in Kansas City, Missouri on June 9, 1943.

Zalcman received his Ph.D. from the Massachusetts Institute of Technology in 1968 under the supervision of Kenneth Myron Hoffman.

In 1961, Zalcman graduated from Southwest High School in Kansas City, Missouri.

In the theory of normal families, Zalcman's Lemma, which he used as part of his treatment of Bloch's principle, is named after him. Other eponymous honors are Zalcman domains, which play a role in the classification of Riemann surfaces, and Zalcman functions in complex dynamics. In the theory of partial differential equations, the Pizzetti-Zalcman formula is named after him.

In 2012, Zalcman became a fellow of the American Mathematical Society.

Zalcman died in Jerusalem on May 31, 2022.

Selected publications
 
 with Peter Lax: Complex proofs of real theorems, American Mathematical Society 2012

References

1943 births
2022 deaths
Israeli mathematicians
Fellows of the American Mathematical Society
Academic staff of Bar-Ilan University
Massachusetts Institute of Technology School of Science alumni
Complex analysts